Errolosteus goodradigbeensis is an extinct buchanosteid arthrodire placoderm. Its fossils have been found in Emsian-aged marine strata of New South Wales, Australia.

The holotype of E. goodradigbeensis was described at the same as its sympatric relative, Arenipiscis.  Errolosteus can be distinguished by having a comparatively short, broad skull.

References

Buchanosteidae
Placoderms of Australia